(born 6 November 1961) is a Japanese video game designer. He is most famous for assembling the team that created Chrono Trigger, which he produced, and for his designs for the Final Fantasy series.

Games
Kazuhiko Aoki has been credited, in some capacity, with the following games.

References

External links

Living people
1961 births
Japanese video game directors
Square Enix people